The African Cross Country Championships is a regional cross country running competition for athletes from Africa.

History
The competition had a one off edition in 1985 in Nairobi, Kenya, and the medallists were mostly from the host nation. Following an announcement by the International Association of Athletics Federations (IAAF) that the IAAF World Cross Country Championships would change to a biennial format, the Confederation of African Athletics stated that the 2011 African Cross Country Championships would be held in Cape Town, South Africa, marking a relaunch of the competition.

While all other continental regions defined by the IAAF have had their own regional cross country championships on an annual or biennial basis, Africa did not have a regular competition in this mould for a long period. This may have been due to a number of factors including: the high status of annual cross country meetings such as the Kenya National Cross Country Championships and the Jan Meda International Cross Country (which doubles as the Ethiopian championships), the size of the region, the prominence of smaller regional championships, and the comparative lack of resources available to the Confederation of African Athletics.

The fact that the majority of the sport's top competitors come from Africa means that the top runners at the World Cross Country Championships, especially in the men's section, are largely the same ones which would form the field of an African Championships – at the 2009 IAAF World Cross Country Championships the top 25 finishers in the men's race, and the top 12 in the women's race, were all African-born. Commenting on the dominance of the competition, IAAF president Lamine Diack said that the competition had "become not only an African affair but an East African affair, and these days you don't even get athletes from West Africa competing".

A number of smaller regional championships have been held in Africa: the East African Cross Country Championships and the Maghreb Cross Country Championships in North Africa are both well-established competitions. West and Central African competitions have also been held in past years.

Editions

Champions

1985 medallists

Individual

Team

References

External links
Athletics Africa website

 
Cross country running competitions
Cross Country
Cross country
Athletics team events
Recurring sporting events established in 1985
Continental athletics championships
Biennial athletics competitions
1985 establishments in Kenya